Věra Hainzová (née Bruneová; 24 November 1930 – 14 July 2018) was a Czech academic painter and animator of cartoons for children, especially Zdeněk Miler's popular The Mole character.

Bibliography 
Věra Hainzová (maiden name Bruneová) studied at the State School of Graphics in Prague under Professor Zdenek Balaš and Professor Petr Dillinger and at the Academy of Arts, Architecture and Design in Prague under Professor Antonín Kybal, where she successfully graduated in 1956.

Hainzová began her artistic activity at the Centre for Folk Art Creation (ÚLUV, later called Krásná jizba) designing textile patterns. From 1958, she was employed for 44 years at the Bratři v triku cartoon studio, first in Prague in Klárov, later in Barrandov Studios. As an animator, she breathed life into dozens of cartoon characters in hundreds of films – the most famous is certainly the animated series The Mole by Zdeněk Miler, which gained international popularity. There are currently 49 Mole episodes.

Hainzová expanded her rich artistic activity with illustrations of children's books and fairy tales on projected slides, such as Tales of the Old Raven, a Lappish fairy tale published in many language versions by the Artia publishing house, and What the Bunny Had for Dinner, published by Albatros. She also illustrated five classic fairy tales on slides.

However, her largest complete work is a set of 83 watercolors of villas in the town of Dobřichovice, which she painted between 2000 and 2015. In it, she captured the villas of Dobřichovice before World War II, according to her memories from her youth.

Exhibitions 
 1957 – Folk production in Chodsko – Centre for art folk creation (textile)
 1957 – Exhibition of Czechoslovak Textile – Slavonic Island in Prague
 1958 – Tablecloths in the Czech Republic pavilion dining room – International exhibition in Brussels
 1959 – Textile exhibition with L. Těhník and J. Hausner – Young Gallery
 1959 - Textile exhibition with R. Mejsnar and J. Jelínek – Gallery exhibition hall, Charles Square in Prague
 1960 – Czechoslovak Artists exhibition – Canada (textile)
 1963 – Bilance group textile exhibition – the third members' exhibition of "Umělecká Beseda" artists – gallery of the Czech writers (textile)
 1988 – Exhibition of animated artwork (drawings for films) – Manes in rague
 1999 – Drawings for cartoons exhibition – hall of dr. Fürst in Dobřichovice
 2006 – Akvarely Dobřichovice a Brunšov – hall of dr. Fürst in Dobřichovice

Filmography 
Animated cartoons

Bibliography

Illustrations 
 Tales of the Old Raven, a Lappish fairy tale published by Artia
 What the Bunny Had for Dinner, published by Albatros

Fairy tales on projected slides 
 Wild Swans, Hans Christian Andersen 
 Boil, pot!, Karel Jaromír Erben 
 The Little Marmaid, Hans Christian Andersen 
 Water Lady, Božena Němcová 
 The Firebird and the Ryška Fox, Karel Jaromír Erben

Watercolors of Dobřichovice villas 

The paintings are not numbered in ascending order according to the time when Věra Hainzová-Bruneová painted them. They were subsequently numbered at once when the "Dobřichovice and Brunšov Watercolors exhibition" was organized in 2006, according to thematic grouping – for example, all the paintings of Procháska's Villa Luisa were grouped under the numbers 10a, 10b, 10c and 10d, even though they were painted successively in different years.

References

External links 
 Věra Hainzová at Czech Movie Database
 Věra Hainzová at The Archive of Fine Arts 
 

1930 births
2018 deaths
Artists from Prague
Czech illustrators
Czech animators
Czech women artists
Academy of Arts, Architecture and Design in Prague alumni